Oyer is an unincorporated community in St. Clair County, in the U.S. state of Missouri.

History
A post office called Oyer was established in 1882, and remained in operation until 1935. William Oyer, an early postmaster and local merchant, gave the community his last name.

References

Unincorporated communities in St. Clair County, Missouri
Unincorporated communities in Missouri